Peacocks is a fast-fashion retail chain from the United Kingdom based in Cardiff, Wales. The chain is now part of the Edinburgh Woollen Mill group, and employs over 6,000 people. There are currently over four hundred Peacocks retail outlets located in the United Kingdom; and more than two hundred stores located in twelve other countries throughout Europe.

Originally selling home goods and basic clothing, Peacocks has been re-branded over the years as a value fashion store.

Richard Kirk, the former owner of the chain, worked hard to transform Peacocks into a major fashion player. The retailer won numerous awards, notably the Best Value Retailer award from Drapers. In January 2012, Peacocks entered administration and was bought by the Edinburgh Woollen Mill Group. Edinburgh Group also owns the Jane Norman chain, a fashion outlet for women.

History

Founding
Peacocks was established in Warrington in 1884, as a family-run business selling a wide range of goods. Over the years, Peacocks Penny Bazaar has expanded, opening more outlets and tailoring its look to keep up with the times and trends. It has remained a family business throughout the Peacocks family history.

Relocation and expansion
The company moved to Cardiff in the 1940s, where it remains headquartered. The move had a profound impact on the group's growth, which for many years concentrated its increasing network in south Wales and southern England.

Peacocks expanded further in the early 1990s, and the company was listed on the London Stock Exchange in December 1999.

2005: Management buyout
In October 2005, a £400 million management buyout led by Richard Kirk was negotiated, funded and organized by Echelon Capital and sponsored by Goldman Sachs, as well as hedge funds like Och-Ziff and Perry Capital controlling 55% of the new holding company. On 1 February 2006, the company unlisted from the exchange, and again became privately owned.

In line with the increased demand for value for money fashion, Peacocks began to provide high fashion women's wear, men's wear and children's wear. High street outlets were revamped and placed together, with a steer towards prime locations.

2012: Administration
On 16 January 2012, Peacocks confirmed that it planned to enter administration, putting up to 100,000 jobs at risk. On 18 January 2012, KPMG was appointed administrators to Peacocks. On 19 January 2012, 250 head office staff were made redundant.

On 22 February 2012, it was announced that Peacocks had been sold to the Edinburgh Woollen Mill Group. EWM purchased the Peacocks brand, 388 outlets, concessions, the headquarters and logistics functions in Wales. 224 outlets were not sold to EWM, resulting in 3,100 immediate job losses. Some branches reopened, and EWM has stated plans to open hundreds more in the United Kingdom and abroad at some stage in the future.

The Edinburgh Woollen Mill (Group) now consists of two core brands: Peacocks and Edinburgh Woollen Mill.

2020–2021: Administration
On 19 November 2020, the Edinburgh Woollen Mill Group was placed into administration.

On 6 April 2021, it was announced that Peacocks had been brought out of administration by a senior executive backed by an international consortium of investors. Edinburgh Woollen Mill Group's chief operating officer Steve Simpson will take over the business, saving 2000 jobs and 200 stores.

Branches
Branded as Peacocks London, Peacocks has more than two hundred franchise outlets outside the United Kingdom, in Bahrain, Cyprus, Egypt, Georgia, Gibraltar, Greece, Kuwait, Malta, Poland, Romania, Russia, Saudi Arabia, Serbia, Slovakia, Ukraine and United Arab Emirates.

References

External links

 Peacocks retail

1884 establishments in England
Companies formerly listed on the London Stock Exchange
Clothing companies established in 1884
Clothing retailers of the United Kingdom
Clothing retailers of Wales
Companies based in Cardiff
Companies that have entered administration in the United Kingdom
Retail companies established in 1884
Retail companies of Wales